Ranunculus paucifolius, commonly known as the Castlehill buttercup, is an endangered species of buttercup native to New Zealand.

References

paucifolius
Flora of New Zealand
Plants described in 1899